Wuming may refer to:

Wuming Mountain, in Taiwan
Wuming County, in Guangxi, China